Massimo Berta (4 March 1949 – 18 May 2020) was an Italian professional footballer who played as a midfielder.

Career
Born in Genoa, Berta played for Alessandria, Foggia, Lecco, Sambenedettese, Reggiana and Imperia.

References

1949 births
2020 deaths
Italian footballers
U.S. Alessandria Calcio 1912 players
Calcio Foggia 1920 players
Calcio Lecco 1912 players
A.S. Sambenedettese players
A.C. Reggiana 1919 players
U.S. Imperia 1923 players
Serie B players
Serie C players
Association football midfielders